Mohammad Malas (born 1945) is a prominent Syrian filmmaker. Malas directed several documentary and feature films that garnered international recognition. He is among the first auteur filmmakers in Syrian cinema.

Early life
Malas was born in Quneitra on the Golan Heights. He worked as a school teacher between 1965 and 1968 before moving to Moscow to study filmmaking at the Gerasimov Institute of Cinematography (VGIK). During his time at VGIK Malas directed several short films. After his return to Syria he started working at the Syrian Television. There he produced several short films including Quneitra 74, in 1974 and al-Zhakira ("The Memory") in 1977. Along with Omar Amiralay he co-founded the Damascus Cinema Club.

Filmmaking career
Between 1980–81 Malas shot a documentary film, al-Manam, about the Palestinians living in the refugee camps in Lebanon during the civil war. The film was composed of interviews with the refugees in which he asked them about their dreams. Filming took place between the Sabra, Shatila, Bourj el-Barajneh, Ain al-Hilweh and Rashidieh refugee camps. During filming Malas lived in the camps and conducted interviews with more than 400 people. However, the Sabra and Shatila massacre of 1982, which claimed the lives of several people he interviewed, shocked Malas and he stopped working on the project. He finally returned to it after five years, and the film was released in 1987. Al-Manam won first prize at the 1987 Cannes International Audio Visual Festival (FIPA) but was not widely distributed.

Malas directed his first feature film, Ahlam al-Madina, in 1983. The autobiographical coming-of-age film set in Damascus in the 1950s was co-written with Samir Zikra and received first prize at the Valencia and Carthage film festivals. In 1990 Malas shot Nur wa Zilal ("Chiaroscuro"), a documentary film about Nazih Shahbandar whom he described as "Syria's first filmmaker." The film was banned by Syrian authorities and was only allowed to be screened once in 1993 at the American Cultural Center in Damascus.

Malas's second feature film, al-Lail, was realized in 1992. The autobiographical film was set in Quneitra in the years between 1936 and the Arab–Israeli War of 1948. It forms, along with Ahlam al-Madina, the first and second parts of an unfinished trilogy project of Malas's. Al-Lail received international recognition and won first prize at the 1992 Carthage Film Festival. However, the film was banned in Syria and was only screened for the first time in 1996. Malas also collaborated with Omar Amiralay on the 1996 documentary film, Moudaress, about the Syrian pioneer painter Fateh Moudarres. Bab al-Makam, released in 2005, was Malas's third feature film.

Filmography
 A Dream of a Small City (1970)
 Quneitra 74 (1974)
 The Memory (1977)
 Dreams of the City (1983)
 The Dream (1987)
 Chiaroscuro (1990)
 The Night (1992)
 Moudaress (1996)
 Passion (2005)
 Ladder to Damascus (2013)

See also
Cinema of Syria

References

Notes

Bibliography

External links

Living people
1945 births
Syrian film directors
People from Quneitra
Gerasimov Institute of Cinematography alumni